Benton Township, Ohio, may refer to:

Benton Township, Hocking County, Ohio
Benton Township, Monroe County, Ohio
Benton Township, Ottawa County, Ohio
Benton Township, Paulding County, Ohio
Benton Township, Pike County, Ohio

Ohio township disambiguation pages